Sir Thomas Hatton, 1st Baronet (c.1583 – 23 September 1658) was an English politician who sat in the House of Commons of England  variously between 1621 and 1640.

Hatton was the son of John Hatton of  Longstanton, Cambridgeshire and his wife Jane Shute, daughter of Robert Shute, Baron of the Exchequer, and justice of the Court of Common Pleas. Sir Robert Hatton, the politician and landowner,  was his brother.

Hatton was elected Member of Parliament for Corfe Castle from 1621 to 1622 and for Malmesbury  from 1624 to 1625. In 1628 Hatton was elected MP for Stamford until 1629 when King Charles decided to rule without parliament. In April 1640, he was re-elected for Stamford in the Short Parliament He was created a baronet, of Longstanton, Cambridgeshire, by King Charles I on 5 July 1641. 
 
Hatton died at the age of 75.

Hatton married Mary Alington, daughter of Sir Giles Alington (1572-1638) of Horseheath, Cambridgeshire and Lady Dorothy Cecil, daughter of Thomas Cecil, 1st Earl of Exeter. His sons, Thomas and Christopher, succeeded successively to the baronetcy. His daughter, Mary Elizabeth Hatton, married Sir William Boteler of Kinton, Bedfordshire.

References

 
 
 

1580s births
1658 deaths
Baronets in the Baronetage of England
16th-century English people
English MPs 1621–1622
English MPs 1624–1625
English MPs 1628–1629